Nigel De Brulier (born Francis George Packer; 8 August 1877 – 30 January 1948) was an English stage and film actor who began his career in the United Kingdom before relocating to the United States.

Biography

De Brulier was born in Frenchay, a suburb of Bristol on August 8, 1877 as Francis George Packer, the son of James Packer, a Gloucestershire coachman, and his wife Louisa Packer (née Field). De Brulier launched his career as an actor and singer on the stage in his native country and transferred to the American stage after moving to Canada and then to the United States in 1898. In the 1900 U.S. census he was recorded as Francis G. Packer, butler, in a private household in Denver, Colorado. His first film role was a poet in The Pursuit of the Phantom in 1914. In 1915 he acted in the film Ghosts based on a play by Henrik Ibsen.

He portrayed Cardinal Richelieu in the following four films, The Three Musketeers (1921), The Iron Mask (1929), The Three Musketeers (1935) and The Man in the Iron Mask (1939).

He appeared with Douglas Fairbanks in The Gaucho (1927) and was also one of the few actors of the silent era who reached reasonable success in talkies, although his roles in them were quite minor. He played the wizard Shazam in the 1941 Republic serial Adventures of Captain Marvel and also acted in Charlie Chan in Egypt in 1935.

He played Jokaanan, the Prophet in a silent film version of Oscar Wilde's Salome (1923). A clip of De Brulier in Salomé was used in Before Stonewall, a film documenting the gay rights movement. His French-born wife, Natale Octavia de Brulier (1879-1969), was a Christian Science practitioner, and their daughter, Josephine de Brulier (b. Los Angeles, 1911), was an assistant librarian.

Death
De Brulier died in Los Angeles on January 30, 1948. He was interred at Grand View Memorial Park Cemetery in Glendale, California.

Filmography

The Pursuit of the Phantom (1914) - The poet (film debut)
The Hypocrites (1915) - Man in Church (uncredited)
The Spanish Jade (1915) - Don Luis
Ghosts (1915) - Pastor Manders (uncredited)
The Dumb Girl of Portici (1916) - Father Francisco
Ramona (1916) - Felipe Moreno
Pasquale (1916) - Banker
Purity (1916) - Thorton Darcy
Intolerance (1916) - Extra (uncredited)
Joan the Woman (1916) - Man at trial (uncredited)
The Voice on the Wire (1917, Serial) - Professor Duval
The Bond Between (1917) - Feole Zelnar
The Gray Ghost (1917, Serial) - Jacques
Triumph (1917) - Townsman (uncredited)
The Mystery Ship (1917) - James Lee - Betty's Father
The Kaiser, the Beast of Berlin (1918) - Capt. von Neigle
Me und Gott (1918) - The Pacifist
Kultur (1918) - Danilo
The Romance of Tarzan (1918) - Priest
The Testing of Mildred Vane (1918) - Matthew Vane
The Girl o' Dreams (1918) - Phillip Fletcher
The Boomerang (1919) - Antonio Giannone
Sahara (1919) - Mustapha
The Right to Happiness (1919) - Russian Court Member (uncredited)
The Mystery of 13 (1919, Serial) - Raoul Ferrar
The Hawk's Trail (1919)
Flames of the Flesh (1920) - Henri Leland
The Virgin of Stamboul (1920) - Capt. Kassan
The Mother of His Children (1920) - Hadji
That Something (1920)
His Pajama Girl (1920) - Manuel Lopez
 The Dwelling Place of Light (1920)- James Rolfe
The Four Horsemen of the Apocalypse (1921) - Tchernoff
 Cold Steel (1921) - Martinez
Without Benefit of Clergy (1921) - Pir Khan
The Three Musketeers (1921) - Cardinal Richelieu
The Devil Within (1921) - Dr. Philiol
Foolish Wives (1922) - Monk (uncredited)
A Doll's House (1922) - Dr. Rank
Salome (1923) - Jokaanan, the Prophet
Omar the Tentmaker (1922) - Nizam ul Mulk
Rupert of Hentzau (1923) - Herbert
The Eleventh Hour (1923) - Mordecai Newman
The Hunchback of Notre Dame (1923) - Dom Claude
St. Elmo (1923) - Rev. Alan Hammond
Wild Oranges (1924) - Litchfield Stope
Three Weeks (1924) - Dimitri
A Boy of Flanders (1924) - Jehan Daas
Mademoiselle Midnight (1924) - Dr. Sanchez
A Regular Fellow (1925) - Revolutionary
Ben-Hur (1925) - Simonides
The Ancient Mariner (1925) - Skipper
Yellow Fingers (1926) - Rajah Jagore
The Greater Glory (1926) - Dr. Hermann von Berg
Don Juan (1926) - Marchese Rinaldo
The Beloved Rogue (1927) - Astrologer
Wings (1927) - Peasant (uncredited)
The Patent Leather Kid (1927) - The French Doctor
Soft Cushions (1927) - The Notary
Surrender (1927) - Rabbi Mendel Lyon
My Best Girl (1927) - Crippled Pencil Peddler (uncredited)
The Gaucho (1927) - The Padre
Two Lovers (1928) - The Prince of Orange
The Red Dance (1928) - Bishop (uncredited)
The Divine Sinner (1928) - Minister of Police
Loves of an Actress (1928) - Samson
Me, Gangster (1928) - Danish Louie
Noah's Ark (1928) - Soldier/High Priest
The Iron Mask (1929) - Cardinal Richelieu
Thru Different Eyes (1929) - Maynard
The Wheel of Life (1929) - Tsering Lama
The Green Goddess (1930) - Temple Priest
Redemption (1930) - Petushkov
Golden Dawn (1930) - Hasmali - the Witch Doctor (uncredited)
Moby Dick (1930) - Elijah
Son of India (1931) - Rao Rama
Alias the Doctor (1932) - Autopsy Surgeon (uncredited)
Devil's Lottery (1932) - Bettor (uncredited)
Miss Pinkerton (1932) - Coroner James A. Clemp
Chandu the Magician (1932) - Yogi Teacher (uncredited)
Rasputin and the Empress (1932) - Priest (uncredited)
The Monkey's Paw (1933) - Hindu Fakir in Prologue (uncredited)
Life in the Raw (1933) - McTavish
I'm No Angel (1933) - Rajah the Fortune Teller (uncredited)
The House of Rothschild (1934) - Official Giving Instructions to Soldier (uncredited)
Viva Villa! (1934) - Political Judge (uncredited)
Charlie Chan in Egypt (1935) - Edfu Ahmad
The Three Musketeers (1935) - Richelieu
A Tale of Two Cities (1935) - Aristocrat (uncredited)
Robin Hood of El Dorado (1936) - Padre at Wedding (uncredited)
Half Angel (1936) - Dr. Hall
Down to the Sea (1936) - Demetrius
San Francisco (1936) - Old Man - Earthquake Survivor (uncredited)
Mary of Scotland (1936) - Judge
The Garden of Allah (1936) - Lector at Monastery (uncredited)
White Legion (1936) - Father Gonzales
The Last Train from Madrid (1937) - Philosopher (uncredited)
The Californian (1937) - Don Francisco Escobar
Zorro Rides Again (1937, Serial) - Don Manuel Vega [Ch. 1]
Marie Antoinette (1938) - Archbishop (uncredited)
The Hound of the Baskervilles (1939) - Convict
Zenobia (1939) - Townsman at Zeke's Recitation (uncredited)
The Man in the Iron Mask (1939) - Cardinal Richelieu
Mutiny in the Big House (1939) - Convict Mike Faleri
Heaven with a Barbed Wire Fence (1939) - Russian Priest (uncredited)
Tower of London (1939) - Archbishop at St. John's Chapel (uncredited)
The Mad Empress (1939) - Father Fisher
Viva Cisco Kid (1940) - Old Mose
One Million B.C. (1940) - Peytow
Adventures of Captain Marvel (1941, Serial) - Shazam [Ch. 1]
For Beauty's Sake (1941) - Brother
Wrecking Crew (1942) - Father Zachary
The Adventures of Smilin' Jack (1943, Serial) - Lo San
Tonight We Raid Calais (1943) - Danton (final film)

References

External links

English male film actors
English male silent film actors
Male actors from Bristol
1877 births
1948 deaths
20th-century English male actors
British expatriate male actors in the United States
Burials at Grand View Memorial Park Cemetery